St. Charles Towne Center is a two-level, enclosed shopping mall in the planned community of St. Charles in Waldorf, Maryland. In addition to Waldorf and St. Charles, the mall also serves the southern suburbs of Washington, D.C., and has a trade area population of 338,502. Anchor stores are Dick's Sporting Goods, J. C. Penney, Kohl's, Macy's, and Macy's Home Store.

History
The mall opened March 30, 1990, with J. C. Penney, Hecht's, Montgomery Ward, and Sears as anchors. It was built by Melvin Simon & Associates, now known as Simon Property Group. Kohl's was added in 1997. The Montgomery Ward store was split between a second Hecht's location and Dick's Sporting Goods in 2002. Both Hecht's stores became Macy's in September 2006. A movie theatre outside of the mall, formerly known as Cineplex Odeon Cinemas (1988–1998) and Loews Cineplex Entertainment (1998–2005), is now AMC Theatres (2005–present). 

On February 6, 2020, it was announced the Sears location at St. Charles Town Center would be closing as part of a plan to close 31 stores nationwide. The store closed April 2020.

Renovation
St. Charles Towne Center underwent an extensive renovation in 2007 to shift its image to a more family-oriented mall.  The entrances and inside of the mall were redesigned, and the washrooms made larger to allow easier access for families with young children.  In addition, a kid's play area was added to a section of the mall. It took two years to renovate the mall from 2007 – 2008.  The food court was also renovated during the project.

2008 shooting incident
In September 2008, an incident occurred in which a police officer's firearm was used in the mall's parking lot.  According to local authorities, a suspect was seen trying to steal a GPS device from a vehicle when the officer noticed him.  The suspect was treated and released from the hospital, and later charged.

References

External links
St. Charles Towne Center Official site

Shopping malls established in 1988
1988 establishments in Maryland
Simon Property Group
Shopping malls in Maryland
Waldorf, Maryland